¡Mamma Mia! the tenth album by Mexican singer Verónica Castro, It was released in 1988. "Bienvenidos Aquí está" is the theme to Verónica Castro's late night show of the same name. The song "Bienvenidos Aquí está" was also sung in Italian by Gino Renni titled "Canzone esagerata (c’è chi c’ha)" as well as "Decir Adios" sung by Pupo - Fiordaliso titled "La Vita È Molto Di Più". She also won the "Antorcha de Plata" from Viña del Mar en 1989.

Track listing
 "Vagabundo" / Bandolero (Duiser P. Shon, Sosa)
 "Mi Tonto Amor"  (Hosey, Gordon, Villa) 
 "El Rosal"  (Jorge Flores, Ricardo Carreón)
 "Mama mia"  (Sue Y Javier)
 "Decir Adios" / La Vita È Molto Di Più (Ghinazzi, Malepaso, Sosa)
 "Solamente Dios Sabe"   (Verónica Castro, Toto Cotugno) 
 "Soñadora"    (Verónica Castro, Toto Cotugno) 
 "Es La T.V."  (Verónica Castro, Vengo Dope, IL Tiggi Renzo Arbore)
 "Bienvenidos Aquí Está" / Canzone Esagerata (C'e Chi C'ha) (Verónica Castro, Renzo Arbore)
 "Emociones" / Tema Show Verónica   (Roberto Carlos, Vers. L.G. Escolar)

Productor: Edgardo Obregón 
Arreglos. Y Dirección. : Daniel Moncaba

Singles

1988 albums
Verónica Castro albums
Spanish-language albums
PolyGram albums